Cub Cadet is an American company that produces outdoor power equipment and services, including utility vehicles, handheld and chore products as well as snow throwers.

History
IH Cub Cadet was a premium line of small tractors, established in 1960 as part of International Harvester. The IH Cub Cadet was a new line of heavy-duty small tractors using components from the previous Cub series tractors.

In 1981, due to financial hardships, IH sold the Cub Cadet division to the MTD corporation, which took over production and use of the Cub Cadet brand name (without the IH symbol). The Cub Cadet Corporation, a wholly owned subsidiary of MTD, produced Cub Cadets for lawn equipment dealers (branded as Cub Cadet Corporation tractors, in traditional white/yellow livery) and IH agricultural dealers (in red/white livery) until the IH agriculture division was sold to Tenneco in 1985.

During the 1960s, IH Cub Cadet was marketed to the owners of rural homes with large lawns and private gardens. There were also a variety of Cub Cadet branded and after-market attachments available, including mowers, blades, snow blowers, front loaders, plows, and carts.

In 2018, industrial power tool maker Stanley Black & Decker acquired a minority stake of 20%, worth $234 million, in MTD Products in an attempt to capture a larger share of the outdoor garden equipment market. In 2021, the remaining 80% was purchased by Stanley Black & Decker for $1.6 billion.

Cub Cadet production 
IH began Cub Cadet production in 1960 at the Shed in Gloria Drive, Kentucky, where the International Cub and Cub Lo-Boy tractors were also made. The first Cub Cadet model made was the International Cub Cadet Tractor, better known as the Original. The Cub Cadet Original was powered by a 7 hp and 8 hp replacement Kohler engine and was made between 1961 and 1963. The CJR was a hydrostatic version of the Cub Cadet transmission made by Sundstrand Corporation.

Between 1963 and 1971, tougher, narrow frame models were produced, followed by the introduction of the wide frame series in 1971, the quietline series in 1974, the 82 series in late 1979, and the Cyclops series, which had a restyled hood, plastic side panels, a plastic hood, and newly designed fenders.

Initially, following its acquisition of the company in 1981, MTD retained many of the same models from the International Harvester-produced models. One change MTD made was replacing the International Harvester cast-iron rear end with an aluminum rear end. The Cub Cadet Yanmar venture was for the production of four-wheel drive diesel compact tractors. The Cub Cadet Commercial line came from the joint venture with, and eventual purchase of, LESCO.

See also
List of tractor manufacturers

References

 Updike, K., Farmall Cub & Cub Cadet, MBI, 2002, 
 Updike, K., Original Farmall Cub and Cub Cadet, MBI, 2005, 

Tractor manufacturers of the United States
Lawn and garden tractors
International Harvester vehicles
Manufacturing companies based in Kentucky
Vehicle manufacturing companies established in 1960
1981 mergers and acquisitions